The Gendarmerie Nationale is the national police force of Mauritania. The gendarmerie is part of the army and maintains posts in the urban and rural parts of the country.

In 2019, 140 gendarmes were deployed as part of a UN multinational peacekeeping force in the Central African Republic.

See also 
 Crime in Mauritania

Notes

Sources
 World Police Encyclopedia, ed. by Dilip K. Das & Michael Palmiotto published by Taylor & Francis. 2004,  
 World Encyclopedia of Police Forces and Correctional Systems, second edition,  Gale., 2006
 Sullivan, Larry E. Encyclopedia of Law Enforcement. Thousand Oaks: Sage Publications, 2005.

References

 
Government of Mauritania